Tharit Charungvat is a former career diplomat from Thailand with more than 30 years of experience in the Thai Foreign Service. After his retirement from the Ministry of Foreign Affairs of Thailand in September 2016, he currently is, among others, Secretary-General of Thailand Foundation and Honorary Adviser to the Committee on Foreign Affairs of the House of Representatives of Thailand.

Career
Ambassador Tharit Charungvat first joined the Ministry of Foreign Affairs of Thailand in 1980 as an Attaché in the ASEAN Department.  After serving as Third and Second Secretary in the Policy and Planning Division of the Ministry, he was posted to the Thai Embassy in Brussels, Belgium from 1990 – 1994 as Second and then First Secretary responsible for Thai-European Community relations.  He then returned to Thailand to serve as Counselor in the Department of Information before moving on in 1997 to begin 8 years of close association with China as the Director of Division III of the Department of East Asian Affairs, which oversees Chinese affairs. This was followed by postings in 1999 to the Royal Thai Consulate-General in Kunming, PRC as the Deputy Consul-General, and then to Hong Kong in 2003 as the Consul-General.

He returned to Thailand in 2004 to take up the post of Ambassador-at-Large at the Foreign Ministry, and over the next two years helped to lay a new ground work for the Ministry’s entry into the digital age of information management and connectivity.  In 2006, he moved on to serve as the Director-General of the Department of South Asia, Middle East and African Affairs, overseeing Thailand’s bilateral and multilateral relations with more than eighty countries from the African continent through the Middle East to the Indian sub-continent.  In 2007 he was appointed as Director-General of the Department of Information and the Official Spokesperson of the Ministry during a sensitive period in Thai-Cambodian relations.

He would hold this post for two and half years until mid-2009 when he began his Ambassadorship assignment abroad, which would see him posted to three important emerging economies successively until his retirement.  He first returned to familiar territory by being appointed Ambassador of Thailand to the Republic of South Africa and accredited to ten additional countries in the Southern African region, namely Angola, Botswana, Lesotho, Malawi, Mauritius, Mozambique, Namibia, Swaziland, Zaire and Zimbabwe. During his time in South Africa, he worked to promote and expand trade, tourism and people to people ties between Thailand and southern Africa. Ambassador Charungvat then moved on at the end of 2011 to become Ambassador of Thailand to the Federative Republic of Brazil. Over one and a half years in Brazil, he worked to further enhance trade, business and investment ties between Thailand and Brazil.  In late-2013 he was appointed to his final posting as Ambassador of Thailand to the Republic of Turkey and accredited also to Azerbaijan, Georgia, Macedonia and Turkmenistan.  During his time in Turkey, which he held until his retirement in September 2016, he helped to promote synergy in security, investment and tourism cooperation, along with people-to-people relations between Thailand and Turkey.

After retirement, he continues to receive important assignments from the Ministry of Foreign Affairs, including, among others, being elected to serve on the Ministry's Civil Service Sub-Commission. He also advises the Ministry on Ministry Reforms.

At the national level, since 2017 he has been part of Thailand's 20 Years National Strategy Committee (NSC) as a member of the National Strategy Drafting Committee on Competitiveness Enhancement to develop Thailand's competitiveness strategy.

In 2019, during Thailand's Chairmanship of ASEAN, which entailed hosting the ASEAN Summit and various ASEAN-related meetings, he was called upon to oversee the management and logistics of all ASEAN-related meetings hosted by Thailand throughout the year, including the Summit among ASEAN leaders in August and the Summit in November between ASEAN leaders and Dialogue Partners and other world leaders, including the Secretary-General of the United Nations.

In December 2019, he became the Secretary-General of Thailand Foundation, which is responsible for Thailand's Public Diplomacy outreach.

From January 2020 onward, he was also appointed Honorary Adviser to the Committee on Foreign Affairs of Thailand's House of Representatives.

Chronology

Education and personal life
Ambassador Charungvat earned a Bachelor of Arts degree in International Relations from Chulalongkorn University in Bangkok, Thailand, and a Master of Arts degree in International Affairs – Asian Study and International Economic Development from The American University in Washington, D.C., U.S.A.  He also completed Thailand’s National Defence College curriculum in 2004.

Ambassador Charungvat is married to Mrs. Vithu Charungvat with one child.

Decorations received

See also
 Ministry of Foreign Affairs of Thailand 
 Foreign relations of Thailand 
 List of diplomatic missions of Thailand

References

External links
 Ministry of Foreign Affairs of Thailand
 Royal Thai Embassy, Ankara, Turkey
Thailand Foundation

Living people
Tharit Charungvat
Tharit Charungvat
Tharit Charungvat
Year of birth missing (living people)
Tharit Charungvat